The 1873 Huntingdon by-election was fought on 17 December 1873. The by-election was fought due to the death of the incumbent MP of the Conservative Party, Thomas Baring. It was won by the Conservative candidate, John Burgess Karslake.

References

1873 in England
1873 elections in the United Kingdom
Politics of Huntingdonshire
By-elections to the Parliament of the United Kingdom in Cambridgeshire constituencies
19th century in Huntingdonshire